Elia Favilli (born 31 January 1989) is an Italian former professional road bicycle racer, who rode professionally between 2011 and 2016.

Born in Cecina, Tuscany, Favilli was also a member of the Arianna Rimor and AGI Neri Lucchini Sprint teams as a junior, finishing second in the Italian junior championships, as well as winning a bronze medal in the world championships – as part of an all-Italian podium alongside Diego Ulissi and Daniele Ratto – in Aguascalientes, Mexico.

Major results

2007
 1st Gran Premio Ellegi
 1st Pisa–Livorno
 1st Memorial Arena e Pezzato
 1st Gran Premio FM Plastic
 1st Coppa Sportivi di Bagnolo
 1st Trofeo Beato Bernardo
 1st Trofeo città di Lucca
 2nd Road race, National Junior Road Championships
 2nd Coppa Ocria
 2nd Trofeo Guido Dorigo
 3rd  Road race, UCI Juniors World Championships
 3rd Memorial Maresciallo Sorvillo
 3rd Trofeo il miglio
2008
 3rd GP Calvatone
 3rd Trofeo Madonna delle Grazie
2009
 1st Giro del Compitese
 1st Trofeo Città di Venturina
 2nd GP Città di Valeggio
 7th Trofeo Franco Balestra
2010
 1st Giro delle Due Province Marciana
 1st Trofeo Petroli Firenze
 1st Gran Premio Città di Vinci
 2nd Trofeo Città di Brescia
 2nd GP La Torre
 2nd G.P. Montanino
2011
 3rd Gran Premio della Costa Etruschi
 10th Classica Sarda
2012
 3rd Overall Giro della Provincia di Reggio Calabria
 6th Scheldeprijs
 9th Strade Bianche
 9th Coppa Bernocchi
 10th Giro di Toscana
2013
 3rd Gran Premio Bruno Beghelli
 9th Trofeo Laigueglia

Grand Tour general classification results timeline

References

External links

Cycling Quotient profile

Italian male cyclists
1989 births
Living people
People from Cecina, Tuscany
Sportspeople from the Province of Livorno
Cyclists from Tuscany